San Pablo is a town and the seat of the Arístides Bastidas Municipality in the state of Yaracuy, Venezuela.

References

Cities in Yaracuy